The 1991 FIFA World Player of the Year award was won by Lothar Matthäus. The ceremony took place at the Madison Square Garden in New York, on December 8, 1991, as part of the 1994 FIFA World Cup preliminary draw. 83 national team coaches were chosen to vote.

Results

References

FIFA World Player of the Year
FIFA World Player of the Year